The John M. Duncan House is a historic house located half a mile south of Winterset, Iowa.

Description and history 
Duncan acquired this land from Canada Fink in 1866, and the house was built sometime after that. It is an early example of a vernacular limestone farmhouse. The house is a single-story, one-room structure with a raised basement. The exterior is composed of large rubble stone laid in an uncoursed broken bond that gives it a wave-like appearance. The house was listed on the National Register of Historic Places on September 29, 1987.

References

Houses completed in 1866
Vernacular architecture in Iowa
Houses in Madison County, Iowa
National Register of Historic Places in Madison County, Iowa
Houses on the National Register of Historic Places in Iowa